Joshua Otis Turner (born November 20, 1977) is an American country and gospel singer and songwriter. In 2003, he signed to MCA Nashville Records. That same year, his debut album's title track, "Long Black Train", was his breakthrough single release. His second album, Your Man (2006) accounted for his first two number-one hits: "Your Man" and "Would You Go with Me", while 2007's Everything Is Fine included a No. 2 in "Firecracker". Haywire, released in 2010, produced his biggest hit, the four week No. 1 "Why Don't We Just Dance" and another number one in "All Over Me". It was followed by Punching Bag (2012), whose lead-off single "Time Is Love" was the biggest country hit of 2012 according to Billboard Year-End.

Early life
Turner was born in Hannah, South Carolina. Growing up in the church, he founded a gospel quartet called Thankful Hearts, where he sang bass, in addition to singing the bass and baritone parts in choirs.

In 1996, Turner developed a lesion on his right vocal cord. Turner was examined by the Vanderbilt voice clinic, where doctors advised him to let it heal on its own. Surgery was not needed, but he did have to rest his voice for a year. While Turner rested his voice back at home, he learned classical vocal technique and how to take care of his voice and avoid developing further problems. Turner states that he "learned how to whistle really well during that year."

After Hannah-Pamplico High School, he spent some time at Francis Marion University before moving to Nashville, Tennessee, to pursue a career in music and enrolled in Belmont University. After college, his fledgling career got a boost on Dec. 21, 2001, during his debut on the Grand Ole Opry, when he debuted a song he wrote titled "Long Black Train". He received a standing ovation in the middle of the song, then sang it again for an encore.

Career

2001–2004: Long Black Train
On December 21, 2001, Turner debuted on the Grand Ole Opry with the song "Long Black Train".

In 2003, Turner released his debut album, also entitled Long Black Train. Prior to its release, Turner had released 7" vinyl singles of "She'll Go on You" and "Long Black Train". Both singles featured Long Black Train album track "Backwoods Boy" as a B-side. While neither "Backwoods Boy" nor "She'll Go on You" were successful (the latter peaking at No. 46 on the country charts), "Long Black Train" spent more than forty weeks on the Billboard country charts, reaching a peak of No. 13 and receiving a gold certification. The third single, "What It Ain't", was less successful, reaching No. 31.

2005–2006: Your Man
In early 2006, Turner released his second album, Your Man. The album's first single and title track, "Your Man", was written by Jace Everett, Chris DuBois and Chris Stapleton and released in late 2005. "Your Man" also climbed the charts slowly, eventually reaching No. 1 in early 2006. Your Man was certified Gold by the RIAA four weeks after its release, and went Platinum six months later.

"Would You Go with Me" was the second single released from Your Man. Like the album's title track, "Would You Go with Me" also reached the top of the country singles charts, holding that position for two weeks; it also reached No. 48 on the  Billboard Hot 100. Turner also performed it on the CMA Awards in November 2006.

Shortly after the album's release, a song called "Me and God" was released as a single to Christian radio. A duet with bluegrass musician Ralph Stanley, the song also featured members of the band Diamond Rio on background vocals. "Me and God" reached a peak of No. 16 on the country charts.

In December 2006, the 49th Annual Grammy Award nominations were announced. Turner received nods for Best Male Country Vocal Performance and for Best Country Album. That same month, a featurette on CMT Insider showed Turner in the studio working on the album. He mentioned that he wanted it to sound like music in the 18th and 19th centuries. Turner performed at the Ryman Auditorium where a live album was recorded, singing a song called, "Church in the Holler". Turner's album Josh Turner: Live At The Ryman was recorded in April and is available exclusively through Cracker Barrel restaurants.

Turner, along with veteran songwriters Brett James and Don Schlitz, wrote a song entitled "Say Yes"; recorded and released by singer Dusty Drake in 2007, the song was a minor Top 40 country hit for Drake, peaking at No. 36.

2007–2011: Everything Is Fine and Haywire
On September 29, 2007, while giving an award to Roy Clark on Clark's 20th anniversary on the Grand Ole Opry, Turner was invited to become a member of the Grand Ole Opry. He was inducted by Vince Gill on October 27, 2007. He is the second youngest member after Carrie Underwood.

Turner's third studio album for MCA Nashville, titled Everything Is Fine, was released on October 30, 2007. Its lead-off single, "Firecracker", became Turner's third Top Ten hit on the country music charts, peaking at No. 2. The second single from Everything Is Fine, a duet with Trisha Yearwood entitled "Another Try", was released in late January 2008, peaking at No. 15. The title track was released as the third single and peaked at No. 20. Everything Is Fine has been certified gold.

At the end of June, Turner wrapped up recording his fourth album, Haywire. The lead-off single, "Why Don't We Just Dance", which was released on August 12, 2009, debuted at No. 57 on the U.S. Billboard Hot Country Songs chart for the week of September 5, 2009. The song went on to become Turner's third Number One hit, spending four consecutive weeks at the top in February 2010. The album was released on February 9, 2010, along with a deluxe version. "All Over Me" was released in April 2010 as the album's second single; it became Turner's fourth Number One.  On September 27, 2010, Turner shot the video for "I Wouldn't Be a Man" in Nashville, which was the third single from Haywire. "Haywire" is now certified gold.

2012–2017: Punching Bag and Deep South

Turner's fifth studio album, Punching Bag, was released via MCA Nashville on June 12, 2012, and preceded by the single "Time Is Love". The song, written by Tom Shapiro, Tony Martin, and Mark Nesler, was released digitally on December 20, 2011, and went for radio adds on January 9. The song reached No. 2 but finished the year as the No. 1 country song of 2012 according to Billboard. The album's second single "Find Me a Baby", was released to country radio on October 15, 2012, but it failed to make top 40 on the country charts.

Also in 2012, Turner released Live Across America with twelve of his songs recorded in concert in different cities. This album was distributed through Cracker Barrel. Turner said, "Those are the most magical performances of each song."

The lead single from Turner's upcoming sixth studio album, "Lay Low", was released to country radio on September 1, 2014. It reached a peak of No. 25 on Country Airplay, at which it remained stalled at for several weeks. The single did not perform as expected on the charts, so Turner's label decided to delay the release of the album and next single. The second single, "Hometown Girl", was released to radio on May 31, 2016.
At Turner's show in Reading, PA on November 5, 2016, he announced that his new album would be released sometime in March 2017.
The album, titled "Deep South", was released on March 10, 2017, preceded by two sneak preview songs, "Deep South" and "Where the Girls Are" released on February 23, 2017. "Deep South" scored Turner his third No. 1 album on the US Top Country Album's Chart upon its release. Turner's second single "Hometown Girl" from "Deep South" peaked at No. 2 on Billboard's Country Airplay Chart and peaked at No. 1 on the Mediabase chart, which makes it Turner's 5th No. 1 single. 
. Turner's third single "All About You," written by Craig Wiseman and Justin Weaver, was released on May 15, 2017.

2018–present: I Serve a Savior
After the release of Deep South, Turner began work on a project of gospel music. Titled I Serve a Savior, his seventh studio album was issued on October 26, 2018. It consists of a collection of mostly gospel standards with a few original songs, including its title track that Turner co-wrote. The album also features appearances by Sonya Isaacs, Bobby Osborne, and Turner's own family (who sing and play instruments on a track penned by his wife and oldest son), and new live renditions of both "Long Black Train" and "Me and God."

Acting
Turner played George Beverly Shea in the 2008 film Billy: The Early Years, about the evangelist Billy Graham. Shea was the soloist for the Billy Graham Crusades.

Personal life
Turner has one brother and one sister. He married his wife Jennifer Ford in 2003. They met at Belmont University, a private Christian university in Nashville, Tennessee, where they both attended school at the time. Jennifer travels with Josh when he's on tour, playing keyboards and singing background vocals. They have four sons together. 

Turner is a devout Christian. Regarding his religion, Turner said "I don't believe God wants me to be a gospel singer, he just wants me to be a Christian singer. That's who I am, a Christian." 

On September 19, 2019, a tour bus carrying Turner's road crew crashed in California, killing one and injuring seven others, according to the California Highway Patrol. Turner was not on the bus.

Discography

Studio albums
 Long Black Train (2003)
 Your Man (2006)
 Everything Is Fine (2007)
 Haywire (2010)
 Punching Bag (2012)
 Deep South (2017)
 I Serve a Savior (2018)
 Country State of Mind (2020)
 King Size Manger (2021)

Awards and nominations

References

External links
 
 Official Josh Turner page at Universal Music Group Nashville
 Josh Turner Interview at CountryMusicPride.com
 

1977 births
American bass-baritones
American country singer-songwriters
American male singer-songwriters
Belmont University alumni
Country musicians from South Carolina
Francis Marion University alumni
Grand Ole Opry members
Living people
MCA Records artists
People from Florence, South Carolina
21st-century American singers
21st-century American male singers
Singer-songwriters from South Carolina